Dead of Night is a 1945 British horror anthology film.

Dead of Night may also refer to:

Film and TV
Deathdream, aka Dead of Night, a 1974 Canadian horror film
Dead of Night (TV series), a 1972 British TV series
Dead of Night (1977 film), a 1977 television film directed by Dan Curtis and written by Richard Matheson
Lighthouse (film), a 1999 British horror film (released in the U.S. as Dead of Night)
"Dead of Night" (Torchwood), a 2011 episode of the TV series Torchwood: Miracle Day
 Dylan Dog: Dead of Night, a 2011 US film

Books and comics
 Dead of Night (zombie novels), a series of zombie apocalypse novels by Jonathan Maberry
Dead of Night (Fighting Fantasy), a Fighting Fantasy gamebook
Dead of Night (comics), a number of comic series from Marvel MAX
The Dead of Night (novel), a novel in the Tomorrow series by John Marsden
 The Dead of Night, a book in the Cahills vs. Vespers series by Peter Lerangis
Dead of Night, the eighth book in the Survivors novel series by Erin Hunter
Dead of Night, the 80th book in the Hardy Boys Casefiles series

Other uses
"Dead of Night", a song by Depeche Mode from their 2001 album Exciter
"Dead of the Night", a song by Bad Company from their 1990 album Holy Water
"Dead of Night", a 1947 episode of the radio series Escape adapted from a segment of the 1945 film
"The Dead of the Night", a 1944 episode of the radio series Suspense